The Princely State of Beja was a Princely State of India, in present-day Himachal Pradesh, from the 19th century till 15 April 1948 when it acceded to India.

References

Princely states of Himachal Pradesh
Princely states of India
History of Himachal Pradesh
18th-century establishments in India
1948 disestablishments in India